Ewen Bumpstead (3 March 1910 – 22 October 1954) was an  Australian rules footballer who played with Geelong in the Victorian Football League (VFL).

Notes

External links 

1910 births
1954 deaths
Australian rules footballers from Victoria (Australia)
Geelong Football Club players
People educated at Geelong College